Pentastar: In the Style of Demons is the third full-length studio album by the drone doom band Earth, released in 1996. It has a more rock-oriented sound than their earlier drone doom work, although in a very minimalist style. "Peace in Mississippi" is a cover of the Jimi Hendrix song. The original vinyl release of the album has an alternative take of "Peace in Mississippi". 

The car depicted on the cover is a "Sassy Grass Green" Plymouth Barracuda, with the car's iconic hockey-stick decal  "Earth." The "Pentastar" named in the album title is an apparent reference to the brand logo of Chrysler, parent company of Plymouth, and also a reference to the fact that it is the fifth release by Earth.

Critical reception
Rolling Stone wrote that "'Introduction' and 'Coda Maestoso in F(flat) Minor', which frame the album, are robust, majestic, Black Sabbath-esque riffs transformed into symphonic hot-rod music." The Gazette declared: "As long as there are wood-paneled suburban basements, heavy amps, delinquent parents, quaaludes and beer, there will be a planet of Earths."

Track listing
All songs written by Dylan Carlson, except where noted.

Personnel
Dylan Carlson – vocals, guitar, vibraphone, piano
Ian Dickson – bass guitar, guitar
Sean McElligot – guitar
Michael Deming – organ
Michael McDaniel - drums

References

1996 albums
Earth (American band) albums
Sub Pop albums